is a Japanese former volleyball player who competed in the 1972 Summer Olympics and in the 1976 Summer Olympics.

He was born in Hiroshima.

In 1972, he was part of the Japanese team which won the gold medal in the Olympic tournament. He played four matches.

Four years later, in 1976, he finished fourth with the Japanese team in the 1976 Olympic tournament. He played all five matches.

External links
 profile

1950 births
Living people
Japanese men's volleyball players
Olympic volleyball players of Japan
Volleyball players at the 1972 Summer Olympics
Volleyball players at the 1976 Summer Olympics
Olympic gold medalists for Japan
Sportspeople from Hiroshima
Olympic medalists in volleyball
Asian Games medalists in volleyball
Volleyball players at the 1974 Asian Games
Volleyball players at the 1978 Asian Games
Medalists at the 1972 Summer Olympics
Medalists at the 1974 Asian Games
Medalists at the 1978 Asian Games
Asian Games gold medalists for Japan
Asian Games silver medalists for Japan
20th-century Japanese people